Lüdke is a surname. Notable people with the surname include:

Bruno Lüdke (1908–1944), alleged prolific German serial killer
Erich Lüdke (1882–1946), German General of the Infantry
Martin Lüdke (born 1943), German journalist and literary critic

See also
Luke (name)

Surnames from given names